Roxby (formerly Rousby) is a village and civil parish in the Scarborough district of North Yorkshire, England. It is located near Staithes.

The population of the civil parish was estimated at 120 in 2014, about the same as the 2001 UK census figure of 119.

Roxby was historically a township in the parish of Hinderwell in the North Riding of Yorkshire.  It became a separate civil parish in 1866.

St Nicholas's Parish Church was built in the 17th century on the site of an earlier church.  It is a Grade II listed building. It includes family tombs of the Boynton baronets.

References

External links

Victoria County History:Hinderwell

Villages in North Yorkshire
Civil parishes in North Yorkshire